Sinum planulatum , the flattened ear snail, is a species of sea snail, a marine gastropod mollusk in the family Naticidae, also known as the moon snails.

Description

Distribution
The marine species occurs off Tanzania and Mozambique.

References

 Spry J.F. (1961) The sea shells of Dar es Salaam: Gastropods Tanganyika Notes and Records

External links
 Gastropods.com: Sinum planulatum

Naticidae
Gastropods described in 1843